The K339/340 Beijing-Jiamusi Through Train is a railway running from Beijing to Jiamusi. It carries express passenger trains for the Harbin Railway Bureau. The Jiamusi passenger segment is responsible for passenger transport. Jiamusi originates on the Beijing train. 25G Type Passenger trains run along the Jingqin Railway, Shenshan Railway, Hada Railway, Binbei Railway and Suijia Railway across Heilongjiang, Jilin, Liaoning, Hebei, Tianjin, Beijing and other areas. The route covers 1675 km. Beijing railway station to Jiamusi railway station runs 23 hours and 27 minutes. Jiamusi railway station to Beijing railway station runs 24 hours and 18 minutes.

See also 
K265/266 Beijing-Jiamusi Through Train

References 

Passenger rail transport in China
Rail transport in Beijing
Rail transport in Heilongjiang